The Rorschach–Heiden railway (RHB) is a railway line and former railway company in Switzerland. It is a standard gauge mountain rack railway, using the Riggenbach rack system and is part of Appenzeller Bahnen. The  route links Rorschach with Heiden.

The line is popular with tourists for its scenic views over Lake Constance. During the summer months, it is operated with old open coaches.

Route
The separate RHB line starts a half a kilometre east of Rorschach station, shortly after it branches off from the Rorschach – Chur line belonging to the Swiss Federal Railways (SBB). The property line is exactly at kilometre 64.41483. The entry signal from Heiden into the Rorschach train station is at kilometre 64.476. This position is often incorrectly stated as the property limit, but in fact it is the operational limit. The property line between SBB and AB and the zero point of the kilometers in the direction of Heiden are behind the SBB depot, directly in front of the two points in the Appenzeller Bahnen parking facility. The rack also begins immediately after the two switches. The gradient that begins afterwards is on average 91 ‰, the maximum value is 93.6‰. Above Wienacht Tobel, the route is a little flatter and only reaches 79.6‰.

The route continues via the stations at Seebleiche, Sandbüchel, Wartensee, Wienacht-Tobel and Schwendi bei Heiden to Heiden. All intermediate stations are request-only stops. The terminal station in Heiden is at an altitude of 794 metres. The trains to Heiden start from Rorschach Hafen station, initially following a piece of the Romanshorn – Rorschach railway line operated by SBB to Rorschach station and from there the route towards St. Margrethen to the junction.

The route runs through the local municipalities (communes) of Rorschacherberg (Seebleiche, Sandbüchel), Thal (Wartensee), Lutzenberg (Wienacht-Tobel), Heiden (Schwendi) and Grub (without a station) and ends in the municipality of Heiden.

Current operations

  –  – 

 Rorschach Hafen
 Rorschach
 
 
 
 
 
 Heiden

The times in the early morning differ from those after 9:00 a.m.

In the summer, steam-powered services are also offered. The historic summer wagons are used in regular operation; a bicycle wagon is used to transport bicycles.

There is no longer freight traffic on the line, with the exception of our own construction trains, as the main customers Starrag and Wolfhalden grain mill have ceased to exist. During the reorganization of Swiss freight traffic, many service points with a lower volume of goods, including all of the RHB, were discontinued.

The motor car BDeh 3/6 25 was repaired between September 2009 to May 2010 in the main workshop of the Rhaetian Railway in Landquart. It was repainted in the current colors and given the AB logo.

The Rorschach-Heiden-Bergbahn is included in the "Ostwind" fare zone system.

Threat of closure
Due to declining frequencies and a cost recovery rate of less than 30%, the cantons of Appenzell Ausserrhoden and St. Gallen are considering whether the three cogwheel railways of the Appenzeller Bahnen from Rorschach Hafen to Heiden, from Altstätten Stadt to Gais, and from Rheineck to Walzenhausen should continue to operate. In particular, a switch to bus operation or fully automatic operation is up for discussion.

History

The first efforts to establish a rail connection to the village of Heiden began in 1871. Early plans for an adhesion railway were soon discarded in favour of a rack-and-pinion line to Rorschach. After receiving the concession in January 1874, construction work began in the spring of the same year. After a year and a half of construction, the line was finished. It was built in such a way that an extension to Trogen was possible. That was specified by the Swiss Federal Assembly. The line was opened on 6 September 1875. The entire route was 7,163 m long at the start of operations, 5,784 m of which were owned by the railway company. The construction costs of the line amounted to CHF 2,225,000, the costs for the rolling stock amounted to CHF 218,200. At the beginning, the railway company had three steam locomotives, nine passenger cars with a total capacity of 400 people and eight freight cars with a total capacity of 56 t.

In 1897 the company was issued a concession allowing the construction of a branch of its line of km. 2,666 to a quarry in the "Chrennen" (then "Krinnen") near Wienacht. For this purpose, a new track with a length of about 250 m was laid, which became an integral part of the entire railway system.

Since 1930 the line has been electrified with the same power system as the SBB network, with single-phase alternating current 15,000 volts and a frequency of 16.7 Hertz.

With retrospective effect on January 1, 2006, the 2006 General Assembly resolved to merge with Bergbahn Rheineck – Walzenhausen (RhW), Trogenerbahn (TB) and the former Appenzeller Bahnen (AB). The four railways now operate under the name Appenzeller Bahnen.

See also 
 :de:Appenzeller Bahnen

References

External links 
 Stadlerrail 
 Rorschach-Heiden-Bergbahn(official web site in German only).

Mountain railways
Defunct railway companies of Switzerland
Rack railways in Switzerland
Rorschach, Switzerland
Transport in Appenzell Ausserrhoden
Transport in the canton of St. Gallen